Andrew Cowan (born 1960) is an English novelist and former director of the creative writing programme at the University of East Anglia.

Biography
Andrew Cowan was born in Corby, Northamptonshire, in 1960 and educated at Beanfield Comprehensive and the University of East Anglia (UEA), where he is a professor of creative writing. He graduated from UEA with a BA in English & American Studies in 1983 and an MA in creative writing in 1985. His teachers on the MA were Malcolm Bradbury and Angela Carter.

His first novel, Pig (1994), won a Betty Trask Award, the Sunday Times Young Writer of the Year Award, the Authors' Club First Novel Award, a Scottish Arts Council Book Award, the Ruth Hadden Memorial Award, and was shortlisted for five other literary awards. Common Ground (1996) and Crustaceans (2000) both received Arts Council bursaries. What I Know was the recipient of an Arts Council Writers' Award and was published in 2005. His creative writing guidebook, The Art of Writing Fiction, was published in 2011. His fifth novel, Worthless Men, was published in 2013, and his latest novel, Your Fault, in 2019.

Previously a long-standing tutor for the Arvon Foundation, he was for three years the Royal Literary Fund Writing Fellow at UEA. He was appointed to the faculty in 2004 and currently teaches and lectures at undergraduate and MA level, and supervises a number of PhD students. In 2011 he wrote UEA's successful submission to the ‘Diamond Jubilee’ Round of the Queen's Anniversary Prizes for Higher and Further Education, and was promoted to a chair in 2012. For ten years until 2018 he was the director of the UEA Creative Writing programme and has lectured on the history and pedagogy of creative writing at conferences and literary festivals around the world.

References

External links
 
 
 Andrew Cowan Archive, University of East Anglia
 Interview with Andrew Cowan: ”Our characters have our DNA”
 Andrew Cowan Interview | Richard Beard

20th-century English novelists
21st-century English novelists
1960 births
Alumni of the University of East Anglia
Academics of the University of East Anglia
Living people
English male novelists
20th-century English male writers
21st-century English male writers
People from Corby